Modern typography was a reaction against the perceived decadence of typography and design of the late 19th century. It is mostly associated with the works of Jan Tschichold and Bauhaus typographers Herbert Bayer, László Moholy-Nagy, El Lissitzky and others.

Design concept 

Modern typography reflected a modern, universal method of communication. This design concept assumes passive, almost automatic – subconscious visual experience. It counts on rationality of both, graphic designer/producer of the message and the audience that is receiving the message. The act of perception that is involved is simple act of seeing; reader is passive, detached and objective. "[Typographic style and layout] do not obstruct the transmission of meaning."
Jan Tschichold codified the principles of modern typography in his 1928 book, New Typography. He later repudiated the philosophy he espoused in this book as being fascistic, but it remained very influential.

Typeface 

The hallmark of early modern typography is the sans-serif typeface. "Because of its simplicity, the even weight of its lines, and its nicely balanced proportions, sans serif forms pleasing and easily distinguished word patterns — a most important element in legibility and easy reading."

Objective 

The Modern typography states as its first objective to develop its visible form out of the functions of the text. For modernist designers it is essential to give pure and direct expression to the contents of whatever is printed: "Just as in the works of technology and nature, 'form' must be created out of function. Only then can we achieve typography that expresses the spirit of modern man. The function of printed text is communication, emphasis (word value), and the logical sequence of the contents." "The trend in modern typography is definitely toward simplicity and legibility, employing forms that comply with the natural inclination of the human eye to seek harmony and ease."

Model of vision 

Modern interpretation of the message assumes objectivity and neutrality. Graphic design, processed through print technology, translates problems and experiences into a visual linear order. There is a single point of view. The designer believes that he/she should control what would be seen. This model of vision rejects interplay between a viewer and image and affirms that our internal makeup does not alter the impressions we receive. The modern designer's objective is to control the viewer's detached visual component so that information is transmitted seamlessly. In attempting to control the eye, modern design dismissed the creativity of viewing. Beatrice Warde wrote a famous article about rules for typography in modern print in 1932. According to her everything about a 'container' is "calculated to reveal and not to hide the beautiful thing which it was meant to contain." To make a good choice of typography, for modernist designer is not a question of "How should it look?" but "What must it do?"  B. Ward pushes to the extreme when she says, "type well used is invisible as type." She denies artistic quality to the printed piece because in her opinion that would mean that its mission is the expression of the designer's self, and not fulfillment of its primary function – conveying the message. These statements are in line with modernist simplicity of Bauhaus, Constructivism, Futurism and their claim that typography, like architecture, must be functional.

See also 
Pioneers of Modern Typography
Kurt Schwitters
Piet Zwart
Alexander Rodchenko
Russian avant-garde
De Stijl
Victorian era
Industrial Revolution

References

Further reading 
Benjamin, Walter (1935), The Work of Art in the Age of mechanical Reproduction, essay.
Clair, Kate (1999), A Typographic Workbook: A Primer to History, Techniques and Artistry, New York: John Wiley & Sons.
Heller, Steven (2002), The Graphic Design Reader, Allworth Press. 
Romanyshyn, Robert D., Technology as Symptom and Dream, London: Routledge.

External links 
 Pioneers of modern typography By Herbert Spencer, Google books
 Typographica, A Journal of Typography

Typography
Bauhaus